Gonbadli (also Romanized as Gonbadlī; also known as Gombazlī, Gonbadlī-ye Now, Gondadalī, Gumbāzl, and Gumbazli) is a village in Khangiran Rural District, in the Central District of Sarakhs County, Razavi Khorasan Province, Iran. At the 2006 census, its population was 1,556, in 362 families.

References 

Populated places in Sarakhs County